The Subercaseaux family is a Chilean family of French descent. They became well known during the 19th century due to their wealth amassed in Norte Chico. They have played a very significant role in Chilean mining, winemaking, politics and arts.

Prominent members
Benjamín Subercaseaux (1902–1973), writer and researcher.
Elizabeth Subercaseaux (born 1945), journalist and writer.
 (c.1730–1800), the family patriarch and mining industry pioneer.
Francisco Valdés Subercaseaux (1908–1982), Capuchin missionary. Declared "venerable" by Pope Francis in 2014.
 (born 1943), painter.
 (1790–1859), entrepreneur and politician.
Ramón Subercaseaux Vicuña (1854–1937), painter and diplomat. His three sons were:
Juan Subercaseaux (1896–1942), archbishop
Luis Subercaseaux (1882–1973), athlete and politician
Pedro Subercaseaux (1880–1956), painter
Victoria Subercaseaux (1848–1931), socialite.

External links
 Genealogy of the Subercaseaux family @ Genealog.

Chilean families
Subercaseaux family